Psittacodrillia bairstowi is a species of sea snail, a marine gastropod mollusk in the family Horaiclavidae.

Description
The length of the shell varies between 9 mm and 12 mm.

The characters of the shell resemble those of Psittacodrillia albonodulosa (Smith E. A., 1904), but the fifth whorl has 11 axial ribs. Its color is white with dark reddish streaks between the ribs. The apex is pailliform. The shell shows spiral threads overall.

Distribution
This marine species occurs off False Bay – North Transkei. South Africa

References

 Sowerby, G. B III. 1886. Marine shells of South Africa, collected at Port Elizabeth, with descriptions of some species. J. Conch. Lond. 5: 1–13.
 P. Bartsch (1915), Report on the Turton collection of South African marine mollusks, with additional notes on other South African shells contained in the United States National Museum; Bulletin of the United States National Museum v. 91 (1915)
 Thiele, J. 1925. Gastropoda der Deutschen Tiefsee-Expedition. II Teil. Wiss. Ergebn. dt. Tiefsee Exped. 'Valdivia' 17: 37–382.
 Kilburn, R.N. & Rippey, E. (1982) Sea Shells of Southern Africa. Macmillan South Africa, Johannesburg, xi + 249 pp. page(s): 117
 Kilburn R.N. (1988), Turridae (Mollusca: Gastropoda) of southern Africa and Mozambique. Part 4. Subfamilies Drilliinae, Crassispirinae and Strictispirinae; Ann. Natal Mus. Vol. 29(1) pp. 167–320
 Steyn, D.G. & Lussi, M. (1998) Marine Shells of South Africa. An Illustrated Collector’s Guide to Beached Shells. Ekogilde Publishers, Hartebeespoort, South Africa, ii + 264 pp. page(s): 152

External links
  Tucker, J.K. 2004 Catalog of recent and fossil turrids (Mollusca: Gastropoda). Zootaxa 682:1–1295.
 

Endemic fauna of South Africa
bairstowi